Abiramam is a panchayat town in Ramanathapuram district in the Indian state of Tamil Nadu.

Geography

Demographics
, Abiramam had a population of 6636. Males constitute 49% of the population and females 51%. Abiramam has an average literacy rate of 78%, higher than the national average of 59.5%; with 53% of the males and 47% of females literate. 10% of the population is under 6 years of age.

Schools
Abiramam has some of the oldest Schools in the District - Muslim Higher Secondary School (more than 75 years old) and S.N. Ismail Middle School

References

Cities and towns in Ramanathapuram district